Josh Whelchel is a composer and a musician, best known for his work in video games such as The Spirit Engine 1 and 2 and Bonesaw. He also contributed music to Scrolls (video game) with Mattias Häggström Gerdt.

In 2013, he joined the A Capella Records team to create the music licensing and distribution service Loudr. He operates as a co-founder and Chief Technology Officer.

Discography

Albums
2018 Castle Story (Original Soundtrack) [with FX Dupas, Mathieu Lavoie, Mattias Häggström Gerdt]
2017 KROMAIA (Original Soundtrack)
2016 Masquerada: Songs and Shadows (Original Soundtrack)
2015 Oblitus (Original Soundtrack)
2013 Rise of the Blobs Original Soundtrack
2012 Me and My Dinosaur 2 Original Soundtrack [with David Saulesco]
2012 Jottobots, original sound.
2011 Ravenmark: Scourge of Estellion (Original Soundtrack)
2011 Wind-up Knight Soundtrack
2010 GunGirl 2: Original Soundtrack
2010 SkullPogo: Original Soundtrack
2008 Bonesaw: Original Soundtrack
2008 The Spirit Engine 2 – Complete Original Soundtrack
2003 The Spirit Engine: Original Soundtrack
2008 The Spirit Engine 2 – Selections
2008 stories vol. 1 (2001–2008)
2008 Premonitions Vol. 1: Selections
2008 Premonitions Vol. 2: Calling of Fate
2008 Premonitions Vol. 3: The Few Who Cross a World
2008 Premonitions Vol. 4: A Lost Dream

Singles
2015 ＣＥＴＲＡ の ＧＡＩＡ (appears on Materia: Final Fantasy VII Remixed by Materia Collective)
2013 Monolith (feat. Amanda Appiarius) (appears on FZ: Side Z)
2011 Zelda's First Trip to the "Village"
2011 The Light of the Darkness Theme
2011 So Blue (feat. Amanda Appiarius)
2011 Power of the Meat (feat. Melinda Hershey) (appears on Super Meat Boy Soundtrack)
2011 Dies, Nox et Omnia (feat. Ryan C. Connelly and Danielle Messina)
2008 Get Loud (feat. Ryan C. Connelly)
2008 Space Sushi Can't Swim in Four Loko

References

External links
 Whelchel's official website
 
 
 Bandcamp page
 Josh Whelchel on VGMdb

1987 births
Living people
Musicians from Louisville, Kentucky
DuPont Manual High School alumni